Erochus or Erochos was a town of ancient Phocis that was destroyed in the Greco-Persian Wars by the army of Xerxes I in 480 BCE.

The city was again destroyed in the Third Sacred War, and was not rebuilt; it was located between Charadra and Tithronium, in the western part of the mount Cithaeron. Its site is located near Kato Souvala.

References

Populated places in ancient Phocis
Former populated places in Greece